Bathycrinus australocrucis is a species of sea lily, a crinoid in the family Bathycrinidae. It is native to the New Zealand region. It was described  by D. G. McKnight.

Distribution

References 

Bourgueticrinida
Animals described in 1973